Mr. Hughes (Curtis Hughes, born 1964) is an American professional wrestler.

Mr. Hughes may also refer to:

 "Mr. Hughes", a bonus track on the deluxe edition of Demi Lovato's Confident
 Coded reference to George Harrison in Garden Party (Rick Nelson song)

See also 
 Hughes (surname)
 Hughes (disambiguation)